The Happy Prince may refer to:

 The Happy Prince and Other Tales, a collection of stories for children by Oscar Wilde
 "The Happy Prince" (story), the title story of the collection
 The Happy Prince (Bing Crosby and Orson Welles album), a 1946 studio album of phonograph records by Bing Crosby and Orson Welles of the Oscar Wilde short story "The Happy Prince"
 The Happy Prince (The La De Das album), a 1969 album by New Zealand rock band The La De Das
 The Happy Prince (1974 film), an animated short film adaptation of the short story by Oscar Wilde
 The Happy Prince (2018 film), a British biographical drama film about Oscar Wilde